Israel Radio International or Reka (or  ) is the radio service of the Israeli Public Broadcasting Corporation (IPBC) for immigrants and listeners abroad.

Overview
Operating since 1950, the shortwave transmissions of Kol Israel ("Voice of Israel") on Reshet Hey ("Network E") broadcasts to the entire world. They are also the main link between Israel and the Jewish diaspora. In its early years, under the name "Kol Zion la'Gola" ('Voice of Zion to the Diaspora), Israeli broadcasts were the sole reliable and direct source of information for Jews living in the Arab countries and behind the "Iron Curtain". However, broadcasts to Europe, Asia, Africa, and Latin America also emerged as an important aspect of Israel's public diplomacy around the world.

Administered by the overseas broadcasting division, Israel Radio International currently transmits to listeners abroad in 14 languages: English, French, Russian, Bukharan, Georgian, Mugrabian (Judeo-Moroccan Arabic), Yiddish, Tigrinya, Ladino, Spanish, Romanian, Hungarian, Persian, Amharic and Aramaic.

Apart from news and broadcasts reflecting events in the country, the channel transmits documentaries on Judaism, the history of the Israeli people, Israeli culture and discussions on immigration and absorption.

As of the summer of 2007, the only Israel Radio International / Reshet Hey produced programming, is Persian. The rest of Israel Radio International, is a relay of the domestic REKA network. For example, the English news broadcasts on REKA and Israel Radio International are now identical.

As of June 30, 2013, due to budget cuts, the Persian service is no longer on shortwave. The Persian service is still available via satellite and on the web at the IBA World website, as well as the radis.org website.

As of April 1, 2008, the only shortwave broadcasts which were left were 1.5 hours of Persian aimed at Iran. The Persian Service was founded by Amnon Netzer in 1958.

The Israel Radio English news may be heard on some radio stations which use the WRN feed. These stations do not broadcast at the same schedule as Israel Radio does, they are time delayed by WRN.

As of April 25, 2013, WRN is no longer carried on Sirius/XM. WRMI has said that they may add WRN programming back to their schedule in the future. As of December 16, 2013, WRN no longer hosts on-demand audio and podcasts. Israel Radio International is still available on WRN's English stream, though.

See also
Culture of Israel
IBA News
Israel Broadcasting Authority
Kol Yerushalayim, the Hebrew program of Jerusalem Calling, the radio station of the British Mandatory Authority
Kol Yisrael, Israel's public domestic and international radio service.
Menashe Amir
Media of Israel

References

External links 

 REKA domestic immigrant network. Live and on-demand audio, as well as text headlines. Includes link for the live Reshet Hey Persian broadcast, now that www.intkolisrael.com has been taken down.
  WRN where you can find their live streams which include Israel Radio.
 Unofficial Persian Israel Radio website. Links to audio, shortwave frequencies, etc.
 Radio frequencies for IBA networks. REKA is listed under "IBA World"

Radio stations in Israel
International broadcasters
Radio stations established in 1955
Israel Broadcasting Authority
1955 establishments in Israel